Rómulo Ignacio Sánchez Oviedo (born April 28, 1984) is a Venezuelan former professional baseball pitcher. He pitched in Major League Baseball (MLB) for the Pittsburgh Pirates and New York Yankees, in Nippon Professional Baseball (NPB) for the Tohoku Rakuten Golden Eagles, and in the Chinese Professional Baseball League (CPBL) for the Chinatrust Brother Elephants.

Career

Pittsburgh Pirates
Sánchez was signed as an undrafted free agent by the Los Angeles Dodgers on March 8, 2002. He played in the Dominican Summer League in 2002 and 2003.

He was released by the Dodgers on March 12, and was picked up by the Pittsburgh Pirates on May 7, 2004. He pitched in the Venezuelan League in 2004 for the Pirates. In 2005, he began to play in the Pirates minor league system beginning in rookie ball and ending the year in Double-A Altoona. In 2006, Sánchez played in two Single-A levels and also played Double-A ball.

Sánchez began the 2007 season with the Altoona Curve. When Salomón Torres went on the disabled list on August 25, 2007, for the big league club, Sánchez was called up. He had gone 6–3 with a 2.81 ERA in 40 relief appearances for the Curve. He made his Major League debut on August 26, 2007 for the Pirates against the Houston Astros, throwing two thirds of an inning. In parts of two seasons with the Pirates, he was 1–0 with a 4.60 ERA in 26 games. On July 1, 2008, Sanchez picked up his only MLB save during a 6-5 extra inning Pirates victory over the Reds.

New York Yankees
Sánchez was traded to the New York Yankees for Eric Hacker on May 16, 2009.  Following the 2009 season, Sánchez was added to the 40-man roster to protect him from the Rule 5 draft.  On May 7, 2010, the Yankees recalled Sánchez to the major leagues. He appeared in two games and worked four and one third innings without allowing a run.

Out of options, the Yankees sold Sánchez to the another team after designating him for assignment at the end of 2011 spring training.

Tohoku Rakuten Golden Eagles
On April 11, 2011, Sánchez signed with Tohoku Rakuten Golden Eagles of the Nippon Professional Baseball (NPB).
He was 0–2 with a 4.96 ERA in 15 games. On November 29, 2011, he became free agent.

Tampa Bay Rays
On January 19, 2012, Sanchez signed a minor league contract with the Tampa Bay Rays. He was assigned to Triple-A Durham before the season. On August 2, Sanchez was released by the Rays. He went 2–2 with a 6.31 ERA in 34 appearances with Durham.

Olmecas de Tabasco
In 2013, he played with the Olmecas de Tabasco of the Mexican League, where he was 0–2 with an 8.59 ERA in 8 games.

Los Angeles Dodgers
He signed a minor league contract with the Los Angeles Dodgers in December 2013. He was released March 2014.

See also
 List of Major League Baseball players from Venezuela

References

External links
, or Retrosheet, or Pura Pelota

1984 births
Living people
Altoona Curve players
Brother Elephants players
Cardenales de Lara players
Durham Bulls players
Gulf Coast Pirates players
Hickory Crawdads players
Indianapolis Indians players
Leones del Caracas players
Lynchburg Hillcats players
Major League Baseball pitchers
Major League Baseball players from Venezuela
Mexican League baseball pitchers
New York Yankees players
Nippon Professional Baseball pitchers
Olmecas de Tabasco players
Pittsburgh Pirates players
Scranton/Wilkes-Barre Yankees players
Baseball players from Caracas
T & A San Marino players
Tohoku Rakuten Golden Eagles players
Venezuelan expatriate baseball players in Japan
Venezuelan expatriate baseball players in Mexico
Venezuelan expatriate baseball players in Taiwan
Venezuelan expatriate baseball players in the United States
Venezuelan expatriate baseball players in San Marino
Venezuelan Summer League Pirates players
World Baseball Classic players of Venezuela
2013 World Baseball Classic players
Venezuelan expatriate sportspeople in Belgium